This is a list of women writers who were born in Paraguay or whose writings are closely associated with that country.

Dora Acuña (1903–1987), poet, journalist, radio presenter
María Luisa Artecona de Thompson, (1937–2003), writer particularly for children
Chiquita Barreto (born 1947) novelist and academic
Gladys Carmagnola (1939–2015), acclaimed poet, wrote for adults and children
Raquel Chaves (born 1939), poet, journalist, educator
Susy Delgado (born 1949), poet, writes in Spanish and Guarani
Renée Ferrer de Arréllaga (born 1944), poet, novelist
Josefina Pla (1903–1999), Spanish-born Paraguayan poet, playwright, critic, journalist
Mercedes Sandoval de Hempel (1919–2005), lawyer, feminist, legal writings
Carmen Soler (1924–1985), poet, educator, moved to Argentina
Elsa Wiezell (1926–2014), poet, teacher, artist
Faith Wilding (born 1943), Paraguayan-American feminist artist, non-fiction writer, educator

References

See also
List of women writers
List of Spanish-language authors

-
Paraguayan
Writers
Writers, women